The 2010 V8 Supercar Championship Series was an FIA sanctioned international motor racing series for V8 Supercars. It was the twelfth V8 Supercar Championship Series and the fourteenth series in which V8 Supercars have contested the premier Australian touring car title. The championship began on 19 February in the Middle East at Abu Dhabi's Yas Marina Circuit and concluded on 5 December at the Homebush Street Circuit. These events were held in all states of Australia and in the Northern Territory as well as in the United Arab Emirates, Bahrain and New Zealand. The 51st Australian Touring Car Championship title was awarded to the winner of the Drivers Championship by the Confederation of Australian Motor Sport.

James Courtney won the Drivers Championship for Dick Johnson Racing by 65 points from Jamie Whincup in the final race of the season at the 2010 Sydney Telstra 500. Championship Team of the Year was awarded to Triple Eight Race Engineering and Champion Manufacturer of the Year to Holden.

Teams and drivers
The following teams and drivers contested the 2010 championship.

Italics indicate driver did not take part in a race.

Team changes

 On 29 July 2009, it was officially announced that Triple Eight Race Engineering would switch from Ford to Holden following Ford's withdrawal of funding from all of their teams except for Ford Performance Racing and Stone Brothers Racing.
 Rod Nash Racing, owners of the #55 Racing Entitlement Contract which was operated by Tony D'Alberto Racing in 2008 and 2009, became a customer of Ford Performance Racing and as such moved from Holden to Ford. Paul Dumbrell has been confirmed as driver.
 James Rosenberg Racing was revived using the Racing Entitlement Contract of Paul Cruickshank Racing. The team used a customer Stone Brothers Racing Ford.
 Tasman Motorsport was officially disbanded on 20 November 2009, with the team selling its Racing Entitlement Contracts to Tony D'Alberto Racing and the newly formed Lucas Dumbrell Motorsport.
 Lucas Dumbrell Motorsport was formed by Paul Dumbrell's brother, Lucas Dumbrell. The team acquired a VE Commodore and employed Daniel Gaunt as their driver.

Driver changes
 Fabian Coulthard was released from his Paul Cruickshank Racing contract to join Walkinshaw Racing. Andrew Thompson also joined Walkinshaw Racing with expanded sponsorship from Bundaberg Rum.
 Tim Slade moved from Paul Morris Motorsport to James Rosenberg Racing.
 Jason Bargwanna was announced as a new signing for Kelly Racing, joining Rick and Todd Kelly. Multiple Sports Sedan Champion, Tony Ricciardello was confirmed to drive the fourth Kelly Racing car with the support of Super Max and Stratco.
 Greg Murphy joined Paul Morris Motorsport to drive the team's second car alongside Russell Ingall. The car carried Castrol sponsorship. Murphy missed the opening round of the series at Yas Marina Circuit due to a date clash with his hosting duties for Top Gear Live in New Zealand. Team principal Paul Morris replaced him for the event.
 Jason Bright moved from Britek Motorsport to Brad Jones Racing. Part of the deal saw the Britek Motorsport licence operated as a third Brad Jones Racing Commodore with Karl Reindler driving the additional car.

Mid-season changes
 Immediately prior to the Norton 360 Sandown Challenge, Jason Richards withdrew from the rest of the 2010 championship to have surgery to remove a tumor. Andrew Jones took over the seat.
 After the Hidden Valley round Gaunt was replaced by Cameron McConville, with Lucas Dumbrell Motorsport citing the need for an experienced driver to progress further. On 28 October 2010, it was announced that Warren Luff would drive the Lucas Dumbrell Motorsport Holden Commodore for the rest of 2010 and 2011.

Wildcard entries
 Three Fujitsu V8 Supercar Series teams were granted wildcard entries to the two co-driver endurance events, the Phillip Island 500 and the Bathurst 1000. The three teams, Greg Murphy Racing, MW Motorsport and Sieders Racing Team, were also the three teams who were granted wildcard entries in 2009. A fourth team, Adrenaline Motor Racing (who last raced at Bathurst as Novocastrian Motorsport in 1997), withdrew their application. MW Motorsport subsequently confirmed it would use one of its own BF Falcons. The Sieders Racing Team later withdrew their wildcard entry after a budget shortfall.

Rule changes
Full-time drivers were no longer allowed to partner one another for the endurance races at the L&H 500 at Phillip Island and the Supercheap Auto Bathurst 1000 at Mount Panorama in an effort to make both the championship and the endurance races more competitive.

For the Armor All Gold Coast 600, each team had to include a driver who races in an overseas series. The majority of nominated drivers were sourced from the IndyCar Series.

Following a failed attempt to get former champion Marcos Ambrose to make a one-off guest appearance at the 2009 Sydney Telstra 500, the V8 Supercars Executive Board approved plans to allow for one-off guest drives. The system would work in a similar fashion to the "Wildcard" entries that the series allows to drivers and teams from the Fujitsu Development Series to step up to the V8 Supercars during the endurance races. Ambrose had been earmarked as a target for such an appearance, with the series looking to allow international drivers to take part in the offshore races in Bahrain and Abu Dhabi at the start of the season.

Race calendar
The following events made up the 2010 series. The proposed event for Queensland Raceway in early May was cancelled in January after V8 Supercar and circuit operators were unable to agree to terms. The Ipswich venue was later restored to the calendar. Barbagallo Raceway was later removed with V8 Supercar citing workplace health and safety regulations.

Calendar is as follows:

Publicity
Immediately prior to the season start, V8 Supercar launched a new publicity campaign, centred around American singer Pink and her 2001 recording Get the Party Started. The advertising campaign is called  "The Greatest Show on Wheels" and is the first of a three-year deal between V8 Supercar and Pink.

Points system
Points are awarded to the driver or drivers of a car that completes 75% of the race distance and is running at the completion of the final lap.

NOTES:

Std denotes all races except the L&H 500, Bathurst 1000, and Surfers Paradise.  These three races have unique rules.

L&H 500:   The Phillip Island event was split into two qualifying races and a 500 km feature race.  The two drivers per team were grouped into separate qualifying races that counted towards drivers' individual point totals and towards the starting grid for the feature race.  The two drivers then shared one car for the 500 km endurance race.

Bathurst:  Two drivers shared one car for the race.

Armor All Gold Coast 600:  Each V8 Supercar team was required to have an international driver included in its driver lineup for each 300 km race.  The international driver was required to complete 30% of the race distance. The event was run under a National permit, allowing International licence holders to compete but not to score championship points. This differed from the Bathurst event which was run under an International permit.

Championship standings

Drivers Championship

Teams Championship

 (s) denotes a single-car team.
 (w) denotes a wildcard Fujitsu series team.

Champion Manufacturer of the Year
Holden took out the Champion Manufacturer of the Year award, having clinched the title at the Gold Coast 600 event with its 14th race win of the year. The award is given to the manufacturer that scores the most race wins during the Championship season.

See also
2010 V8 Supercar season

References

Supercars Championship seasons
V8 Supercar Championship Series